The CNS 11643 character set (Chinese National Standard 11643), also officially known as the Chinese Standard Interchange Code or CSIC, is officially the standard character set of Taiwan (Republic of China). In practice, variants of the related Big5 character set are de facto standard.

CNS 11643 is designed to conform to ISO 2022. It contains 16 planes, so the maximum possible number of encodable characters is 16×94×94 = 141376. Planes 1 through 7 are defined by the standard; since 2007, planes 10 through 15 have also been defined by the standard. Prior to this, planes 12 to 15 (35344 code points) were specifically designated for user-defined characters. Unlike CCCII, the encoding of variant characters in CNS 11643 is not related.

EUC-TW is an encoded representation of CNS 11643 and ASCII in Extended Unix Code (EUC) form. Other encodings capable of representing certain CSIC planes include ISO-2022-CN (planes 1 and 2) and ISO-2022-CN-EXT (planes 1 through 7).

History
The first edition of the standard was published in 1986, and included planes 1 and 2, deriving from levels 1 and 2 of Big5, with some re-ordering due to corrected stroke counts, two duplicate characters being omitted, and the addition of 213 classical radicals. Extensions to the standard were subsequently published in 1988 (6319 characters, occupying plane 14) and 1990 (7169 characters, occupying plane 15).

Unicode 1.0.0, although it did not yet include hanzi, included characters for compatibility with CNS 11643: the CJK Compatibility Forms block was titled "CNS 11643 Compatibility" in Unicode 1.0.0. When the Unicode CJK Unified Ideographs set was being compiled for Unicode 1.0.1, the national bodies submitted character sets to the CJK Joint Research Group for inclusion. The version of CNS 11643 submitted included the plane 14 extension, in addition to further desired characters appended to plane 14 (after 68-21, the last used code point in the standard version of the extension).

In the second edition of the standard, published in 1992, a much larger collection of hanzi was defined across seven planes. A subset of the 1988 plane 14 extension, including the 6148 code points 01-01 through 66-38, became plane 3 (with the remaining 171 characters, code points 66-39 through 68-21, being instead distributed amongst plane 4). The plane 15 extension was not included, although 338 of its characters were included amongst planes 4 through 7.

The third edition of the standard, published in 2007, added the Euro sign, ideographic zero, kana and extensions to the existing bopomofo and Roman alphabet support to plane 1. It introduced planes 10 through 14, containing additional hanzi, and incorporated the existing plane 15 extension into the standard itself (with gaps left where the characters already existed in planes 4 through 7). It also added 128 further hanzi to plane 3, starting at code point 68-40.

, there are several thousand CNS 11643 characters with no corresponding Unicode character, mostly in planes 10 through 14; these are mapped to the Unicode Supplementary Private Use Area.

Relationship to Big5
Levels 1 and 2 of the Big5 encoding correspond mostly to CNS 11643 planes 1 and 2, respectively, with occasional differences in order, and with two duplicate hanzi existing in Big5 but not in CNS 11643. They can be mapped using a list of ranges. However, the 213 classical radicals in CNS 11643 plane 1 are additional to the characters available in Big5, and further additional characters were added to CNS 11643 plane 1 in 2007. The Big5-2003 variant of Big5 is defined as a partial encoding of CNS 11643.

Within the Big5 hanzi repertoire, only one character is conventionally mapped to Unicode differently from the corresponding character from the first two CNS 11643 planes: to U+5F5D (彝), whereas its CNS plane 1 counterpart is mapped to a related variant at U+5F5E (彞). However, some variant mappings for Big5, such as some defined by IBM, include U+5F5E rather than U+5F5D.

References
 This page is based on the information on the CNS official web site.

External links
 CNS 11643 official web site
 Current CNS 11643 open data, including mapping data
 Unicode Consortium mappings for CNS 11643-1986: planes 1 and 2, plus the 1988 plane 14 (not the 2007 plane 14) with extensions. Uses a single prefixed hex digit to indicate plane.
 CNS 11643 mappings from International Components for Unicode (ICU):
 "CNS-11643-1992": original version, current version. The original version of the mapping includes standard planes 1–7 but includes the plane 15 layout as plane 9; the current version includes only planes 1 and 2. Uses prefixed 0x81 through 0x89 to indicate plane.
 "EUC-TW-2014": standard assignments for planes 1 through 7 and 15, and IBM corporate assignments in planes 12 and 13. CNS codes in EUC format with two-byte plane 1.
 ISO-IR registered CNS-11643 code charts: plane 1, plane 2, plane 3, plane 4, plane 5, plane 6, plane 7

Character sets
Chinese-language computing